The Little Willamette River is a minor tributary of the Willamette River in Linn County in the U.S. state of Oregon. It begins in a gravel pit slightly east of the main stem in a bend of the larger river west of Albany.

Along its lower course, the Little Willamette flows through Bowers Rock State Park, a  tract in a riparian forest. The park, largely undeveloped, with primitive trails and no amenities, is part of the Willamette Greenway. The only named tributary of the Little Willamette is Coon Creek, which enters from the left.

See also
 List of rivers of Oregon
Willamette Riverkeeper

References

Tributaries of the Willamette River
Rivers of Linn County, Oregon
Rivers of Oregon
Willamette River